Ron Dundas (born c. 1934) is a retired Canadian football player who played for the Saskatchewan Roughriders and Edmonton Eskimos, mainly in the Tight end position. He played junior football in Regina. His son, Rocky Dundas, also had a career in the NHL with the Toronto Maple Leafs.

References

1930s births
Living people
Edmonton Elks players